Washington is an unincorporated community located in the town of Washington Island, Door County, Wisconsin, United States. Washington is located on the north side of Washington Island along County Highway W and near Washington Harbor; it is the northernmost community in Door County. Bethel Evangelical Free Church is located in the community.

References

Unincorporated communities in Door County, Wisconsin
Unincorporated communities in Wisconsin